Abolhasan Farhoudi (1923 in Qom, Iran - 19 April 2006 in Paris, France) was a prominent Persian medical scientist, immunologist and pediatrician.

Professor Farhoudi studied medicine at Tehran University where he continued his studies in the field of pediatrics. After graduation, Farhoudi lectured at Tehran University for a few years and then moved to London to become a fellow of immunology and allergy in London GOS hospital. His most important recent work was in inherited disorders of immune function.

He published 39 scientific articles cited in Scopus. The three most cited are
 "Clinical and immunological features of 65 Iranian patients with common variable immunodeficiency " Clinical and Diagnostic Laboratory Immunology 12 (7), pp. 825–832 (2005)	with 46 citations 
"Frequency and clinical manifestations of patients with primary immunodeficiency disorders in Iran: Update from the Iranian primary immunodeficiency registry " Journal of Clinical Immunology 26 (6), pp. 519–532 (2006) with 44 citations
"Primary immunodeficiency in Iran: First report of the national registry of PID in children and adults " in Journal of Clinical Immunology 22 (6), pp. 375–380 (2002) with 42 citations.

He  was the founder of clinical immunology and allergy studies in Iran. He was involved in both lab bench works and clinical medicine. With his colleagues at Harvard Medical School and McGill University, he published his last book on immunology and allergy.

See also 
 Iranian science

References

External links 
 Abolhasan Farhoudi in Pubmed

Iranian immunologists
Academic staff of Payame Noor University
People from Qom
1923 births
2006 deaths
Iranian expatriates in the United Kingdom
Academic staff of Tehran University of Medical Sciences
Physicians of Great Ormond Street Hospital